Henderson is a town in Caroline County, Maryland, United States. The population was 146 at the 2010 United States Census. It was named for a stockholder of the Delaware and Chesapeake Railroad.

Athol was listed on the National Register of Historic Places in 1989.

Geography

Demographics

2010 census
At the 2010 census of 2010, there were 146 people, 44 households and 28 families residing in the town. The racial make-up of the town was 65.8% White, 2.1% African American, 0.7% Native American, 30.8% from other races and 0.7% from two or more races. Hispanic or Latino of any race were 37.0% of the population.

There were 44 households, of which 38.6% had children under the age of 18 living with them, 47.7% were married couples living together, 4.5% had a female householder with no husband present, 11.4% had a male householder with no wife present, and 36.4% were non-families. 22.7% of all households were made up of individuals, and 6.8% had someone living alone who was 65 years of age or older. The average household size was 3.32 and the average family size was 3.64.

The median age was 30 years. 23.3% of residents were under the age of 18, 13% were between the ages of 18 and 24, 34.2% were from 25 to 44, 23.9% were from 45 to 64 and 5.5% were 65 years of age or older. The sex make-up of the town was 52.7% male and 47.3% female.

The median household income was $32,500 and the median family income was $33,125. Males had a median income of $30,625 and females $21,875. The per capita income was $11,678. There were 16.1% of families and 14.2% of the population living below the poverty line, including 15.2% of under eighteens and 16.7% of those over 64.

Transportation
The main method of travel to and from Henderson is by road. The only state highway serving the town is Maryland Route 311, which travels north-south through the area.

References

Towns in Maryland
Towns in Caroline County, Maryland